M1923 may refer to:

 Beretta M1923, a semi-automatic pistol
 M1923 helmet (Denmark), a combat helmet used by the Danish military
 M1923 medium tank prototype, United States; pre–World War II
 M1923 sniper rifle, a subtype of the Krag–Jørgensen sniper rifle
 Thompson Model 1923, a heavy submachine gun variant of the Thompson submachine gun